Nomalanga Mzilikazi Khumalo is a Zimbabwean politician. 
Older sister of South African based Advocate Ike Thamsanqa Khumalo
Khumalo is the Movement for Democratic Change member of parliament for Umzingwane and was in September 2008 elected as Deputy Speaker of the House of Assembly, in the Seventh Zimbabwean parliament.

References 

Year of birth missing (living people)
Living people
Members of the National Assembly of Zimbabwe
Movement for Democratic Change – Mutambara politicians